David Alden Lambert (June 19, 1917 – October 3, 1966) was an American jazz lyricist, singer, and an originator of vocalese. He was best known as a member of the trio Lambert, Hendricks & Ross. Lambert spent a lifetime experimenting with the human voice, and expanding the possibilities of its use within jazz.

Career
Lambert's band debut was with Johnny Long's Orchestra in the early 1940s. Along with early partner Buddy Stewart, Lambert successfully brought singing into modern jazz (concurrently with Ella Fitzgerald). In the late 1950s he teamed with wordsmith and vocalese pioneer Jon Hendricks. The two were later joined by Annie Ross, and the lineup was a hit.

After Ross left the group in 1962, Lambert and Hendricks went on without her by using various replacements, but the partnership ended in 1964. He then formed a quintet called "Lambert & Co." which included the multiple voices of Mary Vonnie, Leslie Dorsey, David Lucas, and Sarah Boatner. The group auditioned for RCA in 1964, and the process was documented by filmmaker D. A. Pennebaker in a 15-minute documentary entitled Audition at RCA,. It was one of the last images recorded of Lambert, as two years later he was killed in a highway incident.

Death
Accounts of Lambert's death vary slightly in details. It is established that he was on the Connecticut Turnpike and that a flat tire was involved and that he was struck by a tractor-trailer truck driven by Floyd H. Demby in the early hours of October 3, 1966. The disabled vehicle was not fully off the roadway and its lights were turned off. In addition, an account on D. A. Pennebaker's website states that the accident was on the Merritt Parkway.

Some accounts mention that Richard Hillman was killed in the same incident. Newspaper stories differ about whose vehicle was disabled. Jet magazine's account says it was a panel truck owned by Lambert. Jon Hendricks' telling of the story says that Lambert was a compulsive do-gooder and that he had stopped to assist another motorist. The newspaper follow-up stories say that Demby was not at fault and that Lambert and Hillman were in the roadway when they were struck.

References

Further reading

External links

 

1917 births
1966 deaths
20th-century American singers
American jazz singers
Road incident deaths in Connecticut
Vocalese singers
People from Boston
Jazz musicians from Massachusetts
20th-century American male singers
American male jazz musicians
Lambert, Hendricks & Ross members